Donald Ira Holmes (born April 1, 1961) is former American football coach and former professional wide receiver in the National Football League. He was drafted by the Atlanta Falcons in the 12th round of the 1984 NFL Draft. He played college football at Mesa State and Colorado.

Although he was selected in the 1984 draft, he elected to return to college that year. During the 1984 season, he attempted to file an exemption to play in the NFL, but was rejected under the "Red Grange Rule" that forbade players from playing both college and pro football in the same year. He joined the Falcons in 1985, but was released and signed by the Indianapolis Colts. After suffering an injury in 1986, he was placed on injured reserve; when the Colts attempted to get him back on the roster, the St. Louis Cardinals picked him off waivers.

References

External links
Mesa State Mavericks bio

1961 births
Living people
American football wide receivers
Colorado Mesa Mavericks football players
Colorado Buffaloes football players
St. Louis Cardinals (football) players
Phoenix Cardinals players
Cologne Centurions (NFL Europe) coaches
Players of American football from Miami
Coaches of American football from Florida
Sports coaches from Miami